, meaning "Yurihonjō city hina doll route",  is the name of an event held in March in Yurihonjō City in Akita Prefecture in Japan, in which visitors can follow a map of public displays of the traditional Hina dolls at over 50 different locations around the city.

Background
Hinamatsuri, known as the Japanese Doll Festival and celebrated as Girls' Day, is a traditional cultural observance in Japan, held on March 3, the third day of the third month. In 2005, the new city of Yurihonjō was created as a result of a merger of seven towns and one city. Many households had fine Hinamatsuri doll sets, and so in 2008 the new city organized this Yurihonjō Hinakaidō event.

The Shōnai area across the border from Yurihonjō in Yamagata Prefecture used to be an important port of call and trading centre for the Kitamae trading ships. These ships often brought the latest trends and crafts from the imperial capital in Kyoto, among them the traditional Hina dolls, and for over 100 years Shōnai had organised tours with information and maps to enable people to see the beautiful craftwork of the Hina dolls at various places around Sakata, Tsuruoka and the other towns which make up the Shōnai area.

The first Yurihonjō Hinakaidō event, in 2008, was largely based around the Yashima area, which already had its own small-scale Hina doll display custom. In 2009, the Hina Doll tour of Yurihonjō tried to encompass the different areas of the newly merged city with over 50 different locations divided into four main areas: Iwaki in the north; Ouchi and Honjō in the centre; and Yashima in the south.

The event in 2010 was extended further with additional displays at new locations and houses.  Tour companies in Sendai offer package tours, such as the national train operator JR East.  It has also received coverage in the media such as a feature article in the Sakigake newspaper.  A dedicated blog was also set up by Akita Prefecture to promote the event.

The Yurihonjō doll displays

The Hina doll displays in this event vary greatly in size, history and style.

Exhibition halls

See also 
 Hinamatsuri
 Yurihonjō

References

External links
   「由利本荘ひな街道」が開催中！ Festival page at Yurihonjo City official web site (Retrieved on March 17, 2009)
 The Shonai Hina Doll Tour
 The Yurihonjo Hina Doll Tour
 Hinamatsuri (Doll's Festival)

Festivals in Japan
Festivals in Akita Prefecture